Mattias de' Medici (9 May 1613 – 11 October 1667) was the third son of Grand Duke Cosimo II de' Medici of Tuscany and Archduchess Maria Maddalena of Austria. He was governor of Siena, with interruptions, from 1629. He never married.

Biography
Mattias pursued an ecclesiastical career, like his brother Gian Carlo, but found it was not to his liking. Instead, he embarked on a military career at the age of 16. His father, Cosimo II, died on 28 February 1621; he was succeeded by Ferdinando de' Medici, the elder son. On 29 May 1629, Grand Duke Ferdinando appointed Mattias governor of Siena, following the death of their aunt and the then governor, Catherine de' Medici.

He arrived in his domain on 27 August and took up residence in the Piazza del Duomo. Spending the bulk of his time in Siena, he was immensely popular among the Sienese. In 1631, he joined the Austrian belligerency in the Thirty Years' War. He took part in the famous battle of Lützen, in November 1632, where he met Sienese General Ottavio Piccolomini.

Upon his return to the grand duchy in 1641, he resumed the reins of Sienese government. He did not stay long, nevertheless, as the Wars of Castro broke out. Ferdinando II vested in him supreme authority over the grand duchy's military affairs, and thus he commanded the league of the Republic of Venice, the Grand Duchy of Tuscany, the Duchy of Parma and the Duchy of Modena and Reggio against the Barberini Pope, entrusting the government of Siena to his brother Cardinal Leopoldo de' Medici for the duration of his absence.

Mattias adored the arts, patronising Justus Sustermans, Volterrano and many other eminent artists. He also loved horse races and was particularly enthusiast of the famous Palio, which he promoted during its early history. While in Germany, he acquired scientific instruments, such as dials, astrolabes and compasses; all of which he later deposited in the Uffizi.

In later life, suffering from gout, he pondered re-assuming ecclesiastical garb; however, he fell ill and died in Siena on 11 October 1667 at 54 years of age. He was buried in the Medici tombs in San Lorenzo, Florence.

References

Citations

Bibliography

Young, G.F.: The Medici: Volume II, John Murray, London, 1920

Ancestors

External links

Online archive of documents on the Medici family
 

|-

|-

|-

 

1613 births
1667 deaths
Mattias
Nobility from Florence
Mattias de' Medici
Governors of Siena
17th-century Italian nobility
Burials at San Lorenzo, Florence
Field marshals of the Holy Roman Empire
17th-century Italian military personnel
Sons of monarchs
Military personnel from Florence